Peristeri B.C. in international competitions is the history and statistics of Peristeri B.C. in FIBA Europe and Euroleague Basketball Company European-wide professional club basketball competitions.

European competitions

Record
Peristeri has an overall record, from 1991–92 (first participation) to 2003–04 (last participation) of: 67 wins and 58 losses, plus 1 tie in, 126 games played in all the European-wide professional club basketball competitions.
 (1st–tier) EuroLeague: 10–16 in 26 games.
 (3rd–tier) FIBA Korać Cup: 43–32, plus 1 tie, in 76 games.
 (3rd–tier) FIBA Europe League: 5–7 in 12 games.
 (4th–tier) FIBA Europe Champions Cup: 9–3 in 12 games.

See also
 Greek basketball clubs in international competitions

External links
FIBA Europe
EuroLeague
EuroCup
ULEB

Greek basketball clubs in European and worldwide competitions
Europe